Communalism may refer to:
 African communalism, a system of interdependence in rural Africa
 Christian communism, form of religious communism based on Christianity
 Communalism (Bookchin), a theory of government in which autonomous communities form confederations
 , a historical method that follows the development of communities
 Communalism (South Asia), violence across ethnic or communal boundaries
 Intentional community, a planned, socially-cohesive, residential community
 Medieval communalism, a system of mutual allegiance and defense between cities in the European Middle Ages
 Municipalism, governance by a region's local administrative division

See also 
 Communal (disambiguation)